The flagtail catfish or stripedtail catfish, Dianema urostriatum, is a tropical freshwater fish belonging to the Callichthyinae sub-family of the family Callichthyidae.  It originates in the Amazon Basin in South America.

It natively inhabits waters with a pH range of 6.0 to 8.0, a hardness of 5 – 19 DH, and a temperature of 25° – 28 °C (77° – 82 °F).

References 

Callichthyidae
Freshwater fish of Brazil
Freshwater fish of Colombia
Fish of the Amazon basin
Fish described in 1912